The Rebellion of Túpac Amaru II (4 November 1780 – 15 March 1783) was an uprising by cacique-led Aymara, Quechua and mestizo rebels aimed at overthrowing Spanish colonial rule in Peru. The causes of the rebellion included opposition to the Bourbon Reforms, an economic downturn in colonial Peru and a grassroots revival of Inca cultural identity led by Túpac Amaru II, an indigenous cacique and the leader of the rebellion. While Amaru II was captured and executed by the Spanish in 1781, the rebellion continued for at least another year under other rebel leaders.

Background
The government of Spain, in an effort to streamline the operation of its colonial empire, began introducing what became known as the Bourbon Reforms throughout South America.  In 1776, as part of these reforms, it created the Viceroyalty of the Río de la Plata by separating Upper Peru (modern Bolivia) and the territory that is now Argentina from the Viceroyalty of Peru.  These territories included the economically important silver mines at Potosí, whose economic benefits began to flow to Buenos Aires in the east, instead of Cuzco and Lima to the west.  The economic hardship this introduced to parts of the Altiplano combined with systemic oppression of Indian and mestizo underclasses (a recurring source of localized uprisings throughout Spanish colonial South America) to create an environment in which a large-scale uprising could occur.

In 1778 Spain raised sales taxes (known as the alcabala) on goods such as rum and pulque (the common alcoholic beverages of the peasants and commoners) while tightening the rest of its tax system in its colonies, in part to fund its participation in the American Revolutionary War.  José Gabriel Condorcanqui, an upper-class Indian with claims to the Inca royal lineage, adopted the name Túpac Amaru II (alluding to Túpac Amaru, the last Inca emperor), and in 1780 called for rebellion. He claimed to be acting on behalf of the King of Spain, enforcing royal authority on the corrupt and treacherous colonial administration. He was motivated in part by reading of a prophecy that the Inca would rule again with British support, and he may have been aware of the British colonial rebellion in North America and Spanish involvement in the war. Additionally, the growth of mining as a source of colonial revenue was caused in large part by the increased burden placed on indigenous workers who formed the base of the labor used to mine silver, leading to increased unrest.

Rebellion near Cusco
On 4 November 1780, after a party in Tungasuca, where Túpac was a cacique, Túpac and supporters seized Antonio Arriaga, the corregidor of his hometown of Tinta. They forced him to write letters to his treasurer in Tinta requesting money and arms and to other powerful individuals and kurakas ordering them to congregate in Tungasuca. On 10 November, six days after his capture, Arriaga was executed in front of thousands of gathered Indians, mestizos, and criollos (locals of partial Spanish descent). Following the assassination of Arriaga, Túpac made a proclamation citing several explicit demands related to indigenous issues. These included ending the mita rotational labor system and limiting the power of the corregidor and thus amplifying his own power as cacique.  To the same end, he also sought the creation of a new audiencia at Cuzco. Túpac began moving through the countryside, where he gained supporters, primarily from the Indian and mestizo classes, but also with some creoles. On 17 November he arrived at the town of Sangarará, where Spanish authorities from Cuzco and the surrounding area had assembled a force of about 604 Spaniards and 700 Indians. Túpac's ad hoc army, which had grown to several thousand, routed this force the next day, destroying the local church where a number of people had taken refuge. Túpac then turned south, against the advice of his wife and lieutenant Micaela Bastidas, who urged him to attack Cuzco before the government could mobilize. Micaela Bastidas was a pivotal force in the Túpac de Amaru rebellion and is often overlooked. Bastidas was known for leading an uprising in the San Felipe de Tungasucsa region. Indigenous communities often sided with the rebels, and local militias put up little resistance. It was not long before Túpac's forces had taken control of almost the entire southern Peruvian plateau.

Spanish colonial administrator José Antonio de Areche acted in response to Túpac's uprising, moving troops from Lima and as far off as Cartagena toward the region. Tupac Amaru II in 1780 began to lead an uprising of indigenous people but the Spanish military proved to be too strong for his army of 40,000–60,000 followers. After being repelled from the capital of the Incan empire the rebels march around the country gathering forces to attempt to fight back. Troops from Lima were instrumental in helping repel Túpac's siege of Cuzco from 28 December 1780, to 10 January 1781.  Following these failures, his coalition of disparate malcontents began to fall apart, with the upper-caste criollos abandoning him first to rejoin the loyalist forces. Further defeats and Spanish offers of amnesty for rebel defectors hastened the collapse of Túpac's forces.  By the end of February 1781, Spanish authorities began to gain the upper hand. A mostly indigenous loyalist army of up to between 15,000 and 17,000 troops led by Jose del Valle had the smaller rebel army surrounded by 23 March. A breakout attempt on 5 April was repulsed, and Túpac and his family were betrayed and captured the next day along with battalion leader Tomasa Tito Condemayta, who was the only indigenous noble who would be executed alongside Túpac.  After being tortured, on 15 May Túpac was sentenced to death, and on 18 May forced to witness the execution of his wife and one of his children before he was himself quartered. The four horses running in opposite directions failed to tear his limbs apart and so Túpac was beheaded.

After Túpac's death
Túpac Amaru's capture and execution did not end the rebellion. In his place, his surviving relatives, namely his cousin Diego Cristóbal Túpac Amaru, continued the war, albeit using guerilla tactics, and transferred the rebellion's focal point to the Collao highlands around Lake Titicaca. The war was also continued by Túpac Katari's female commander named Bartola Sisa. Sisa led a resistance of 2,000 troops for a number of months until they were eventually brought down by the Spanish army.  Government efforts to destroy the rebellion were frustrated by, among other things, a high desertion rate, hostile locals, scorched-earth tactics, the onset of winter, and the region's altitude (most of the troops were from the lowlands and had trouble adjusting). An army led by Diego Cristóbal occupied the strategically important city of Puno on 7 May 1781, and proceeded to use it as a base from which they launched attacks all across Upper Peru. Cristóbal would hold the town and much of the surrounding territory until mounting losses and diminishing support convinced him to accept a general amnesty from Viceroy Agustín de Jáuregui. A preliminary treaty and prisoner exchange were conducted on 12 December, and Cristóbal's forces formally surrendered on 26 January 1782. Though some rebels continued to resist, the worst was over. The last organized remnants of the rebellion would be vanquished by May 1782, though sporadic violence continued for many months.

Diego, his mother, and several of his allies would be arrested and executed anyway by Spanish authorities in Cuzco on 19 July 1783 on the pretext he had broken the peace accords.

During the rebellion, especially after the death of Túpac Amaru II, non-Indians were systematically killed by the rebels. Some historians have described these killings aimed at non-Indians, in conjunction with attempts to violently eradicate various non-Indian cultural customs, as genocidal in nature.

Many of the leaders who fought in the rebellion after Túpac de Amaru's death were discovered to be women (32 out of the 73) and were later acknowledged by the eventual liberator of Spanish America, Simón Bolívar in his speech in 1820.

Women in the Revolution
Throughout the mid 1700s, women had a changing role throughout Latin America. They began getting involved politically, economically, and culturally. Women had begun getting involved in the workforce particularly producing cotton cloth and working as market traders. Because of these growing gender role changes, women were involved in the Túpac Amaru II revolt. Túpac's wife, Micaela Bastidas had commanded her own battalion and she, and her battalion were responsible for the uprising in the San Felipe de Tungasucan region. Micaela Bastidas and Bartola Sisa took part in demonstrations against high prices, food distribution networks, racist treatment of Natives, high taxes, and tightening restrictions on the colonies. Although women were involved in the revolution, and had a very active role throughout their own villages which had led to independence throughout the region, they had received little attention for their efforts.

Aftermath
The ultimate death toll is estimated at 100,000 Indians and 10,000–40,000 non-Indians.

Viceroy Jáuregui lessened mita obligations in an attempt to ameliorate some of the Indians' complaints. In 1784, his successor, Teodoro de Croix, abolished the corregidors and reorganized the colonial administration around eight intendants. In 1787, an audiencia was established in Cuzco.

Areche's decrees following the execution of Túpac Amaru II included the banning of the Quechua language, the wearing of indigenous clothing, and virtually any mention or commemoration of Inca culture and history. Areche's attempts to destroy Inca culture after the execution of Túpac Amaru II were confirmed by royal decree in April 1782, however colonial authorities lacked the resources to enforce these laws and they were soon largely forgotten. Still, paintings depicting the Inca were destroyed, and the juridical institution of the cacique was abolished, with many caciques being replaced by administrators from outside the native locality. This undermined the power of indigenous rulership despite concessions from the viceroyalty.

See also
 Revolt of the Comuneros, a 1781 revolt in the Viceroyalty of New Granada caused by the Bourbon Reforms
 Huilliche uprising of 1792, an indigenous uprising in southern Chile against Spanish encroachment.

References

Further reading
 Fisher, Lillian Estelle, The last Inca revolt, 1780–1783. Norman, University of Oklahoma Press [1966]
 O'Phelan, Scarlett. La gran rebelión en los Andes: de Túpac Amaru a Túpac Catari. Cuzco, Perú : Centro de Estudios Regionales Andinos "Bartolomé de las Casas", [1995]
 Robins, Nicholas A., Genocide and millennialism in Upper Peru: the Great Rebellion of 1780–1782. Westport, Conn. : Praeger, 2002.
 Serulnikov, Sergio. Revolution in the Andes: the age of Túpac Amaru.  Durham : Duke University Press, 2013.
 Walker, Charles F., The Tupac Amaru rebellion. Cambridge, Massachusetts : The Belknap Press of Harvard University Press, 2014.

External links
 The Hispanic American Historical Review, Volume 2
  Empires of the Atlantic World:  Britain and Spain in the Americas 1492–1830

Colonial Peru
Rebellions in South America
Rebellions against the Spanish Empire
Indigenous rebellions against the Spanish Empire
Indigenous politics in South America
Conflicts in 1780
Conflicts in 1781
1780 in the Viceroyalty of Peru
1781 in the Viceroyalty of Peru
18th century in the Viceroyalty of the Río de la Plata
Genocides in South America
Racially motivated violence against white people
Massacres by Native Americans
Massacres in Peru
Anti-Spanish sentiment